The Cypriot Futsal Super Cup is a Cypriot futsal competition contested by the winners of the Cypriot First Division and the winners of the Cypriot Cup.

Winners

Performance by club

References

External links
futsalplanet.com

Super Cup 
Cyprus